Maximilian Seiffert (9 February 1868 – 15 April 1948) was a German musicologist and editor of Baroque music.

Biography
Seiffert was born in Beeskow an der Spree, Germany, the son of a teacher. He was first educated at the Joachimsthal Gymnasium, in Berlin, where he studied under Philipp Spitta, and then at the University of Berlin where he received a Ph.D. in 1891 for his dissertation J. P. Sweelinck und seine direkten deutschen Schüler (Jan Pieterszoon Sweelinck and his German pupils).

He died in Schleswig, Germany on the fifteenth, of April, 1948.

Career
As well as producing modern editions of organ pieces by Bach and Buxtehude, Seiffert was responsible for the following:
Making piano transcriptions of some of Bach's works (in association with Max Schneider).
Assisting with the editing of the Händel-Gesellschaft.

In 1938 he received the Goethe Medal for Art and Science.

References

1868 births
1948 deaths
German musicologists
Nazi Party members
People from Beeskow